Ferenc Mohácsi (born 25 October 1929) is a Hungarian sprint canoeist who competed in the late 1950s. At the 1956 Summer Olympics in Melbourne, he won a bronze medal in the C-2 1000 m event.

References
Ferenc Mohácsi's profile at Sports Reference.com

1929 births
Living people
Canoeists at the 1956 Summer Olympics
Hungarian male canoeists
Olympic canoeists of Hungary
Olympic bronze medalists for Hungary
Olympic medalists in canoeing
Medalists at the 1956 Summer Olympics
20th-century Hungarian people